In the 1842 Iowa Territory Council elections, electors selected councilors to serve in the fifth Iowa Territory Council. All 13 members of the Territory Council were elected. Councilors served one-year terms.

The Iowa Territory existed from July 4, 1838, until December 28, 1846, when Iowa was admitted to the Union as a state. At the time, the Iowa Territory had a Legislative Assembly consisting of an upper chamber (i.e., the Territory Council) and a lower chamber (i.e., the Territory House).

Following the previous election in 1841, Democrats held a majority with eight seats to Whigs' five seats.

To claim a majority of seats, the Whigs needed to net two seats from Democrats.

Democrats maintained a majority of seats in the Iowa Territory Council following the 1842 general election with the balance of power shifting to Democrats holding seven seats and Whigs having six seats (a net gain of 1 seat for Whigs). Whig Councilor John D. Elbert was chosen as the President of the fifth Territory Council to succeed Democratic Councilor Jonathan W. Parker in that leadership position.

Summary of Results 

Source:

Detailed Results
NOTE: The Iowa General Assembly does not contain detailed vote totals for Territory Council elections in 1842.

See also
 Elections in Iowa

External links
District boundaries for the Iowa Territory Council in 1842:
Iowa Territory Council Districts 1840-1844 map

References

Iowa Council
Iowa
Iowa Senate elections